John Logan Power (March 1, 1834 - September 24, 1901) was an Irish-born American politician and publisher, and the Secretary of State of Mississippi from 1896 until his death.

Biography 
John Logan Power was born on March 1, 1834, in Mullinahone, Munster, Ireland. His father died when he was young. He came to the United States in 1850. He moved to Lockport, New York, and then, in 1855, to Jackson, Mississippi. He enlisted as a private in the Confederate Army in 1862, and was a colonel when the Civil War ended. In 1866, he established the Daily Mississippi Standard newspaper, which became a precursor of the Clarion-Ledger. In 1867, he was the clerk of the Mississippi House of Representatives. He was elected to become the Secretary of State of Mississippi in November 1895, and assumed the position on January 20, 1896. He was re-elected in 1899. He continued serving until his death, at 12:30 AM on September 24, 1901, in Jackson, Mississippi.

Personal life 
He married Jane Wilkinson in 1857. Their son, Joseph Withers Power, succeeded John as the Secretary of State of Mississippi.

References 

1834 births
1901 deaths
People from County Tipperary
Irish emigrants to the United States (before 1923)
Secretaries of State of Mississippi
People from Jackson, Mississippi
People from Lockport, New York
Confederate States Army officers
Mississippi Democrats
American newspaper founders
19th-century American businesspeople